Since 31 March 2021, 178 individuals served as representatives in House of Representatives, the 150-seat lower house of the States-General of the Netherlands. Vera Bergkamp was elected Speaker of the House of Representatives for this period.

The members were elected during the general election of 17 march 2021. Sixteen parties were elected to the House, the highest since  1918. After the election, the Fourth Rutte cabinet was formed for this term, consisting of People's Party for Freedom and Democracy (VVD, 34 seats), Democrats 66 (D66, 24 seats), Christian Democratic Appeal (CDA, 15 seats) and Christian Union (CU, 5 seats). Four new parties entered the political body after the election, namely Volt (3 seats), JA21 (3 seats), the Farmer–Citizen Movement (1 seat) and BIJ1 (1 seat). The rest of the opposition consisted of the Party for Freedom (17), the Socialist Party (9), the Labour Party (9), GroenLinks (8), Forum for Democracy (8), the Party for the Animals (6), the Reformed Political Party (3), DENK (3) and 50PLUS (1).

During the term, seven members switched their parliamentary group affiliation, changing the party composition of the House of Representatives. 50PLUS lost its seat in May 2021 due to Liane den Haan continuing as an independent politician. Forum for Democracy lost three seats that same month, as three of its members formed an independent caucus. The CDA lost a seat in September 2021 as a result of Pieter Omtzigt leaving the party, while Volt lost a seat in February 2022 due to its expulsion of Nilüfer Gündoğan. With a peak of 20, this parliamentary term had a record number of parliamentary groups.

Members 
All members are sworn in at the start of the term, even if they are not new. Assumed office in this list therefor refers to the swearing in during this term, while all members are automatically considered to have left office at the end of the term.

Notes

References 

2021-present
Netherlands